Cameron Ansell (born November 28, 1992) is a Canadian voice and television actor, best known for voicing Arthur in the television series of the same name, Cheng in Skyland, and Prince Lumen in Spider Riders. He was born in Picton, Ontario. He is also known for voicing Franklin.

Filmography 
Max & Ruby – Morris (2003 – 2013)
Beyblade: Metal Masters and Beyblade: Metal Fury – Masamune Kadoya (2011–2013)
 Bakugan Battle Brawlers – Marucho Marukura (Episode 1 – 2)
 Suikoden Tierkreis – Liu-Shen and Prince Shams (2009)
 Life with Derek – Teddy (2007)
 Franklin and the Turtle Lake Treasure – Franklin Turtle (2006, U.S. Language version)
 Iggy Arbuckle – Chip (2007)
 Storm Hawks – Additional voices (2007)
 Skyland – Cheng (2006–)
 Spider Riders – Prince Lumen (2006–2007)
 Jane and the Dragon – Prince Cuthbert (2005–2006)
 Arthur – Arthur and Rafi (2004–2007; 2013)
 Postcards from Buster – Arthur (2004–2008)
 The Save-Ums! – Noodle (2005–2006)
 Bigfoot Presents: Meteor – Meteor
 Time Warp Trio – Thutmose
 Miss BG – Gad Mansour (2005–2007)
 Miss Spider's Sunny Patch Friends – Spinner (2006–2008)

References

External links

1992 births
Living people
Canadian male television actors
Canadian male voice actors
People from Prince Edward County, Ontario
21st-century Canadian male actors